Hugo Bonneval (born 19 November 1990) is a French rugby union player. He is the son of Eric Bonneval, another international French rugby player and the brother of Arthur Bonneval (Stade Toulousain). His position is Fullback and he currently plays for Toulon in the Top 14.

On 9 February 2014, he made his debut for France in a 30-10 win against Italy in the 2014 Six Nations Championship.

He is a member of the 'Champions for Peace' club, a group of more than 90 famous elite created by Peace and Sport, a Monaco-based international organization placed under the High Patronage of H.S.H Prince Albert II. This group of top level champions, wish to make sport a tool for dialogue and social cohesion.
http://www.peace-sport.org/our-champions-of-peace/

References

External links
France profile at FFR

1990 births
Living people
French rugby union players
Rugby union players from Toulouse
Stade Français players
Rugby union fullbacks
France international rugby union players
RC Toulonnais players